Wikieup is an unincorporated community and census-designated place (CDP) located on U.S. Route 93 in Mohave County, Arizona, United States. As of the 2020 census, the population of Wikieup was 135.

Geography
Wikieup is in southeastern Mohave County in the valley of the Big Sandy River, between the Hualapai Mountains to the west and the Aquarius Mountains to the east. U.S. Route 93 passes through the community, leading northwest  to Kingman, the Mohave county seat, and southeast  to Wickenburg.

Climate
Wikieup has a hot desert climate (Köppen: BWh). Rainfall averages  annually.

Demographics

History

There is a vandalized historic marker in Wikieup whose inscription once read:

"First exploration probably by early Spanish explorers, Espejo in 1582 and Farfan in 1589. Explored later by Lt. Amiel W. Whipple in 1854. Important agriculture, mining, milling, and smelting area in our early days. The McCrackin Mine discovered by Jackson McCrackin and H. A. "Chloride Jack" Owen in 1874, lies 18 miles south. The Signal Mine was 12 miles south. Stamp mills were at Greenwood, 8 miles southwest and at Virginia City, 9 miles southwest. Cofer Hot Springs 3 miles east."

Education
Residents are zoned to the Owens-Whitney Elementary School District, which operates one K-8 school. Students may choose to attend Bagdad Unified School District or Kingman Unified School District for high school.

Notable people
 Donald Machholz (1952-2022): American amateur astronomer who was credited with the discovery of 12 comets that bear his name.

References

External links
 
 

Census-designated places in Mohave County, Arizona
Census-designated places in Arizona
Unincorporated communities in Mohave County, Arizona
Unincorporated communities in Arizona